The World Masters Mountain Running Championships is an international mountain running competition contested by athletes of the members of WMRA, World Mountain Running Association, the sport's global governing body.

The first edition was held in 2001 with female competitors in six age-groups from 35 and male competitors in seven age-groups from 40.

Editions

Winners

Multiple Edition Winners

This table shows athletes that have won the most races, from 2001 until the 2016 edition.

Winners 2001

Winners 2002

Winners 2003

Winners 2004

Winners 2005

Winners 2006

Winners 2007

Winners 2008

Winners 2009

Winners 2010

Winners 2011

Winners 2012

Winners 2013

Winners 2014

Winners 2015

Winners 2016

See also
World Long Distance Mountain Running Challenge
Commonwealth Mountain and Ultradistance Running Championships

References

Mountain running competitions